Fownhope is a village in Herefordshire, England, an area of outstanding natural beauty on the banks of the River Wye. The population of the village at the 2011 Census was 999.

The village has a church, St. Mary's Parish Church; primary school, St. Mary's C of E Primary School; medical centre, Fownhope Medical Centre; two pubs, the Green Man and the New Inn; two hotels, Bowen's Bed & Breakfast and Ferry Lane Bed & Breakfast (both of which are bed and breakfast hotels); a fitness/leisure centre, Wye Leisure and butchers, John A Pritchard & Son.  There is a village hall and a recreation/sports field and pavilion, both of which are well used by the many clubs and societies in the village, and in the centre is the village Fire Station. On the northern outskirts of the village, towards Hereford, the Lucksall campsite is situated on the river by the Holme Lacy bridge. It is owned by Sir Eli Cartwright whose family owned most of Hereford in the 19th Century.

The nearby Wye Valley Walk with many walks on the hills and banks along the river, is very popular with walkers. The Wye Valley Walk may not pass through Fownhope but is a perfect place to go nearby. In springtime there are fantastic displays of wild flowers in the woods and fields, particularly in the nearby woods, Lea & Pagets Wood. There are many small quarries and lime kilns scattered through the area, and the remains of an Iron Age hill fort on Capler Hill.

The village maintains a strong identity and the Heart of Oak society, an old friendly society, holds a number of events during the year including the annual Heart of Oak Club walk, where villagers, young and old, process through the streets with sticks decorated with elaborate flower decorations behind a local silver band, stopping off at houses along the way for drinks, including the cider made from local apples. The Heart of Oak society also holds the annual fireworks display and bonfire night on the recreation field.

External links

Fownhope Village website
Wye Valley Walk

References 

Villages in Herefordshire